Moppi Productions was a Finnish-based demogroup founded in 1996. It is mainly known for their story-based demos and the demo authoring tool Demopaja. The demo ix, released in 2003, won a total of three awards in the Scene.org Awards gala.

Moppi is usually referred to as the "numedia" demogroup; their demos generally rely on a combination of design and effects, accented by a multitude of design element overlays. Their music is most often some sort of trip hop akin to Massive Attack or Morcheeba.

They became well known on the demoscene for their streak of second places in demoparty compos: starting in 1998 they have released demos consistently placed second in their respective competitions. In "ix" the group, tongue-in-cheek, adapted the catchphrase "We're #2 so why try harder?" - the demo, ironically, also placed second. Their Assembly demo titles also incremented through the alphabet starting with Further in 2000 through Jalousie (a demo that was presented at the party, but crashed during the presentation and the binaries were never released) in 2004. While Moppi did not release a demo in 2005, Sumo Lounge presented an animation, entitled The Week, as his final project at the Lahti Institute of Design. It carries the style of Moppi releases.

Members 
 Mikko "memon" Mononen
 Jukka "sumo lounge" Koops
 Henrik "gstep" Rydberg
 Riikka Kurki
 Sami "ceesam" Kalliokoski

Notable releases 
 "Kolme Pientä Pukkia (Three Little Goats)" (4th at The Party 1997)
 "Hannu & Kerttu 2000" (2nd at Assembly 1998)
 "Further" (not shown at Assembly 2000)
 "FFWD" (2nd at Lobotomia 2000)
 "Gerbera" (2nd at Assembly 2001)
 "Halla" (2nd at Assembly 2002)
 "ix" (2nd at Assembly 2003)
 "Assembly 2004 Invitation" (2nd at Breakpoint 2004)

External links 
 The official website of Moppi Productions
 Moppi on Pouët

1996 establishments in Finland
Demogroups
Finnish artist groups and collectives